The North East Green Belt, also known as the Tyne & Wear Green Belt, is a non-statutory green belt environmental and planning policy that regulates the rural space in part of the North East region of England. It is centred on the county of Tyne and Wear, with areas of belt extending into Northumberland and County Durham. The belt functions to protect surrounding towns and villages outside the Tyneside/Newcastle-upon-Tyne and Wearside/Sunderland conurbations from further convergence. It is managed by local planning authorities on guidance from central government.

Geography
The belt is on the fringes of the Tyne & Wear conurbations, with a line of belt separating South Tyneside from Sunderland. The main coverage of the belt however, is within southern Northumberland, with tracts in northern County Durham, notably surrounding the city of Durham completely.

Much of the boundary is formed by local roads and land features such as rivers. The western extent reaches 25 miles away from Newcastle, beyond Hexham and towards Haydon Bridge, becoming contiguous with the North Pennines AONB and nearly meeting the Northumberland National Park. Due to the belt lying across county borders, responsibility and co-ordination lies with several unitary councils as these are the local planning authorities.

See also
 Green belt (United Kingdom)

References

External links
 Interactive map of green belt land

Green belts in the United Kingdom
Environment of Tyne and Wear
Environment of Northumberland
Environment of County Durham